Steven "Steve" Whitman (1943–2014) was an American social epidemiologist and public health researcher.

Early life and education
Whitman grew up in a poor household in Brooklyn, New York. He received his master's degree in biometrics from the University of Pittsburgh in 1964, followed by a master's degree in biostatistics from Yale University in 1968. He went on to receive his Ph.D. in biostatistics from Yale in 1969.

Career
Whitman joined the faculty of Miles College in Birmingham, Alabama after graduating from Yale. He also taught at other institutions in Birmingham, such as Holy Family Catholic High School, before joining the faculty of Chicago's Northwestern University in 1978. At Northwestern, he was a senior epidemiologist at the Center for Urban Affairs and Policy Research (since renamed the Institute for Policy Research) from 1978 to 1991. In 1991, he left the faculty of Northwestern to join the Chicago Department of Public Health as deputy commissioner and director of the epidemiology program. In 2000, he was hired to found the Sinai Urban Health Institute (SUHI), at which point he left the Chicago Department of Public Health. He served the head of the SUHI from 2000 until his death.

Research
As head of the Chicago Department of Public Health's epidemiology program, Whitman played a major role in studying and explaining the 1995 Chicago heat wave. At the SUHI, he conducted research on racial disparities in breast cancer mortality among women in Chicago and other American cities. He also researched racial disparities in health in the United States more generally.

Death
Whitman died of cancer on July 21, 2014, at Rush University Medical Center in Chicago; he was 71 years old. He is survived by his adoptive daughter, professor and writer Imani Perry

References

1943 births
2014 deaths
American epidemiologists
Deaths from cancer in Illinois
People from Brooklyn
University of Pittsburgh alumni
Yale School of Public Health alumni
Miles College people
Northwestern University faculty